Martin Honegger (born 20 February 1956) is a Swiss rowing coxswain. He competed in the men's coxed four event at the 1988 Summer Olympics.

References

1956 births
Living people
Swiss male rowers
Olympic rowers of Switzerland
Rowers at the 1988 Summer Olympics
Place of birth missing (living people)
Coxswains (rowing)
20th-century Swiss people